Merhav is a surname. Notable people with the surname include:

 Dina Merhav (1936–2022), Croatian-born Israeli sculptor
 Reuven Merhav (born 1936), Israeli diplomat